Sam Neal Winningham (born October 11, 1926) is a former American football coach and player. He served as the head football coach at San Fernando Valley State College —now known as California State University, Northridge—from 1962 to 1968, compiling a record of 21–42–1. He went on to become the chair of the physical education department at CSUN. Winningham played college football at the University of Colorado at Boulder, where he was a quarterback. Winningham was hired as the first head football coach at Valley State in 1960.  He was the head football coach at Bent County High School in Las Animas, Colorado from 1950 to 1952 and Phoenix Union High School in Phoenix Arizona from 1953 to 1959, amassing a career high school football coaching record of 58–35–3.  Winningham earned a master's degree at Arizona State University, and a Ph.D. in physical education from the University of Southern California. Winningham was born in Colby, Kansas, the son of Alida (Bogan) and Neal Winningham. In November 2017, aged 91, he attended a ceremony at CSUN dedicating a plaza in his honor. His daughter is the actress Mare Winningham.

Head coaching record

College

References

1926 births
Living people
American football quarterbacks
Cal State Northridge Matadors football coaches
Colorado Buffaloes football players
High school football coaches in Arizona
High school football coaches in Colorado
Arizona State University alumni
People from Burlington, Colorado
Players of American football from Colorado